Wichers is a surname. Notable people with the surname include:

Edward Wichers (1892–1984), American chemist
Jan Wichers (1745–1808), Dutch military officer and Governor of Suriname
Peter Wichers (born 1979), Swedish musician and producer

See also
Wicher (disambiguation)
Withers (surname)